Cristian Reinaldo Romero Vallejo (born 6 January 1989) is a Paraguayan footballer who plays as a forward.

Career
Romero started his senior career with Tembetary in 2007. Two years later he joined Argentine Primera B Nacional team Boca Unidos but left soon after without making a league appearance. Romero then agreed to sign for Categoría Primera A club Boyacá Chicó in Colombia. He made his professional debut in a league match versus Deportivo Pereira on 8 August 2010. He appeared in ten further fixtures for Boyacá before departing. Spells with Corrientes clubs Deportivo Mandiyú and Textil Mandiyú followed. 2014 saw Romero join Torneo Federal B's Fontana. He joined Ferroviario in 2016 but returned to Fontana months later.

In 2019, Romero completed a move to Torneo Regional Federal Amateur side Defensores de Vilelas. He appeared five times for them.

References

External links
 

1989 births
Living people
People from Villeta
Paraguayan footballers
Paraguayan expatriate footballers
Paraguayan expatriate sportspeople in Argentina
Expatriate footballers in Argentina
Association football forwards
Torneo Argentino A players
Torneo Federal A players
Categoría Primera A players
Club Atlético Tembetary players
Boca Unidos footballers
Boyacá Chicó F.C. footballers
Deportivo Mandiyú footballers
Textil Mandiyú footballers